The Convocation Sejm of 1764 was a session of the Sejm (parliament) of the Polish–Lithuanian Commonwealth. It took place in Warsaw from  7 May to 23 June, and was a confederated convocation sejm, tasked with preparing a new royal election to fill the throne of the Commonwealth. It carried out a series of reforms to the Commonwealth government.

The Sejm was led by Sejm marshal, Adam Kazimierz Czartoryski. Familia party of Czartoryski magnate family, backed by the Russian Empire (whose military forces were occupying parts of the Commonwealth) forced an election of their candidate (Stanisław August Poniatowski). In protest at the presence of Russian forces, and influence of Russian ambassador to the Commonwealth, Herman Karl von Keyserling, many opposition deputies left the session - in the end the Sejm passed its decisions with only 80 deputies (out of 300) and 7 senators (out of 136). The Sejm approved the cession of the territory of the Commonwealth to Russia, made in the Eternal Peace Treaty of 1686.

Reforms and decisions 

Stanisław August Poniatowski elected the new king of the Commonwealth, replacing interrex Władysław Aleksander Łubieński
Emperor titles of Russian Tsar and King of Prussia were recognized
private tariffs were abolished
general tariff for public treasury was introduced
liberum veto was abolished for discussions of financial and military matters
unified system of measurements was introduced
tax system was reformed (kwarta, head tax)
Jewish Council of Four Lands was discontinued as it failed to deliver collected taxes
Commissions of Treasury and Military were created
hetmans powers were limited
crown lands (królewszczyzna) were to be reviewed for incompetent management to increase public revenue
special privileges (serwitoriaty) of some royal craftsman were abolished, along with royal enclaves (jurydyki) near cities but not subject to municipal laws and regulations

References 

1764 in law
1764 in the Polish–Lithuanian Commonwealth
Sejm of the Polish–Lithuanian Commonwealth
Poland–Russia relations